Parcel of Rogues is the fifth studio album by English folk rock group Steeleye Span. It was released in 1973 by Chrysalis Records. The album was their most successful album thus far, breaking into the Top 30.

The album grew out of a theatrical project the band undertook, a version of Robert Louis Stevenson's 1886 novel Kidnapped, staged in Edinburgh. The book and play were set against the backdrop of the Scottish Jacobite movement, and in the course of developing the play, the band came across a considerable amount of 18th-century Scottish poetry that they mined for the album.

If the album has a theme, it is change and the tension between old and new. "The Weaver and the Factory Maid" is about the tension of early industrialisation, with a young man celebrating the factory because there are plenty of women for him to pursue, while an old man denounces the factory because of its economic effects. There is a very sharp contrast between the sweet acoustically-driven "The Ups and Downs" followed immediately by the funky distorted loud guitar in "Robbery with Violins". "Cam Ye O'er Frae France" explores this tension in a different way, both in its lyric denouncement of political changes and in the contrast between the poem's traditional Scots language and its sharp electronic guitars. "Alison Gross" is about a literal change, as an evil witch transforms a man who rejects her into a worm.

"Robbery with Violins" is better known as "The Bank of Ireland" (in O'Neill's book). A version of this tune was played in the film Titanic. "The Ups and Downs" is also known as "The Maid of Tottenham". The satirical "Cam Ye O'er Frae France" refers to King George I and the Jacobite rising of 1715.

Two of the songs on this album originate in Hogg's Jacobite Reliques, while "Rogues in a Nation" is an adaptation of Robert Burns' poem denouncing the Act of Union in 1707 that united England and Scotland. The title of the album derives from a line in the song "Rogues in a Nation", here sung a cappella.

The sleeve shows a milkmaid on decorated tiles, possibly alluding to the recording venue: "Sound Techniques" studio, a former dairy, which still has a statue of a cow on the wall.

The album uses more overdubbing than any previous album by Steeleye Span. On "Hares on the Mountain" there are two channels for Peter Knight's mandolins, two for recorders and one for him playing harmonium. On "The Weaver and the Factory Maid" Maddy Prior is heard on three channels, counterpointing herself.

The album saw the band re-introduce the use of drums, driven in part by Rick Kemp's background in rock. After the album was released, the band undertook a US tour, opening for Jethro Tull. Owing to this, the band decided to add a full-time drummer in the person of Nigel Pegrum. The drums took the band further in the direction of rock, as demonstrated by "The Wee Wee Man" and "Cam Ye O'er Frae France".

Track listing
All songs Traditional, except where noted.

"One Misty Moisty Morning" – 3.30
"Alison Gross" – 5.29
"The Bold Poachers" – 4.18
"The Ups And Downs" – 2.45
"Robbery with Violins" – 1.47
"The Wee Wee Man" – 4.01
"The Weaver and The Factory Maid" – 5.21
"Rogues in a Nation" (Robert Burns) – 4.34
"Cam Ye O'er Frae France" – 2.49
"Hares on The Mountain" – 4.33

Personnel
Steeleye Span
Maddy Prior - vocals
Tim Hart - vocals, guitar, Appalachian dulcimer
Bob Johnson - vocals, guitar
Rick Kemp - bass guitar, drums
Peter Knight - violin, viola, mandolin, piano, recorder, harmonium

References

1973 albums
Chrysalis Records albums
Steeleye Span albums